Facundo Daniel Torres Pérez (born 13 April 2000) is a Uruguayan professional footballer who plays as a winger for Major League Soccer club Orlando City and the Uruguay national team.

Torres has previously played for Peñarol where he won 2021 Uruguayan Primera División title.

Club career

Peñarol
Born in the Colón neighborhood of  Montevideo, Torres grew up in La Paz, Canelones. At the age of four, Torres attended his first training session with his cousin Joaquín at Juventud River but showed little interest and instead sat in the middle of the field and played with dirt. His father later took him to La Paz Wanderers where he enjoyed playing with friends before spending a year with Defensor Sporting. At the age of 10 he was selected to play in the National Championship final to represent the regional southern league in Melo where he was scouted by Peñarol and invited to join their academy. Despite being two years younger than his teammates such as Federico Valverde, Diego Rossi and Santiago Bueno, Torres was a standout player at the tournament. Coached by Robert Lima, Torres continued to be fast-tracked through the age groups and in 2014, helped Peñarol to an under-15 national title. In February 2016, he was invited to train with the professional senior team for the first time, at the age of 15. That same year, Italian Serie A club Juventus made an attempt to sign Torres via his agent Daniel Fonseca. Torres' father opposed the move, thinking he was too young and describing it as "via the back door," parting ways with Fonseca as a result with Torres remaining at Peñarol to continue his development and earn playing time.

Torres was named in a senior matchday squad for the first time on 7 June 2018, as an unused substitute against Defensor Sporting. Moving between the first team and reserves under both Leonardo Ramos and Diego López without ever debuting, Torres was handed his senior debut by Diego Forlán on 16 August 2020 in a 2–0 Primera División win against Boston River. He came on as a 46th minute substitute for Matías de los Santos and scored his team's opening goal five minutes later. He made his continental debut in the delayed 2020 Copa Libertadores group stage, starting all four of the remaining games and scoring once in a 3–0 victory over Chilean side Colo-Colo. In his debut season, Torres made 38 appearances including 34 starts in all competitions and scored six goals.

In 2021, Torres was part of the squad that won the 2021 Uruguayan Primera División title. He made 19 appearances, scoring five goals during the league campaign. In his final competitive appearance for the club, Torres scored the equalizer in the Championship playoff as Peñarol drew 1–1 with Apertura winners Plaza Colonia, clinching the title with a penalty shoot-out victory. He also scored four goals during Peñarol's run to the 2021 Copa Sudamericana semi-finals before being eliminated by eventual winners Athletico Paranaense.

Orlando City
On 24 January 2022, Torres signed for Orlando City of Major League Soccer on a four-year Young Designated Player contract with the option for a fifth. He joined for a reported club record $9 million fee.

International career

Youth
Torres represented Uruguay as a youth international at under-15, under-17 and under-20 level. He was part of Uruguay squad at the 2015 South American U-15 Championship and scored five goals in five games, the joint-third most behind Brazilians Vitinho and Vinícius Júnior, as Uruguay finished runners-up behind Brazil. He is the all-time top scorer for Uruguay under-17s and competed at the 2017 South American U-17 Championship.

Senior
On 5 March 2021, Torres received his first senior Uruguay national team call-up as part of a 35-man preliminary squad for 2022 FIFA World Cup qualifying matches against Argentina and Bolivia. However, CONMEBOL suspended those matches the next day amid concern over the COVID-19 pandemic.

He made his senior international debut on 3 June 2021 in a World Cup qualifier against Paraguay as a 66th minute substitute for Jonathan Rodríguez as Uruguay drew 0–0. He made his first start five days later in another goalless qualifying draw against Venezuela. In June 2021, Torres was named to the squad for the 2021 Copa América and appeared in all five games as a substitute. Uruguay were eliminated at the quarter-final stage on penalties by Colombia.

In November 2022, Torres was named to the final 26-man squad for the 2022 FIFA World Cup. He was an unused substitute for all three games as Uruguay was eliminated at the group stage.

Career statistics

Club

International

Honours
Peñarol
Uruguayan Primera División: 2021

Orlando City
U.S. Open Cup: 2022

Individual
 Uruguayan Primera División Team of the Year: 2020, 2021

References

External links
 
 

2000 births
People from Las Piedras, Uruguay
Living people
Association football forwards
Uruguayan footballers
Uruguay youth international footballers
Uruguay international footballers
Uruguayan Primera División players
Major League Soccer players
Peñarol players
Orlando City SC players
Designated Players (MLS)
2021 Copa América players
2022 FIFA World Cup players
Uruguayan expatriate footballers
Uruguayan expatriate sportspeople in the United States
Expatriate soccer players in the United States